CSOM may refer to:
 Chronic suppurative otitis media
 Carlson School of Management
 Carroll School of Management
 Colorado School of Mines
 Client-side object model, a component of Microsoft's SharePoint platform
 Center for Sex Offender Management
 Clear Skies Over Milwaukee, a ROBLOX Roleplay game.